Kopitnik is a village in Chernoochene Municipality, in Kardzhali Province, in southern-central Bulgaria. As of 2007 it had a population of 5 people.

References

Villages in Kardzhali Province